The Best American Short Stories 2014, a volume in the Best American Short Stories series, was edited by Heidi Pitlor and by guest editor Jennifer Egan.

Short Stories included

References

2014 anthologies
Houghton Mifflin books
Fiction anthologies
Short stories 2014